Dinner Mate is a 2020 South Korean television series starring Song Seung-heon, Seo Ji-hye, Lee Ji-hoon, and Son Na-eun. Based on the 2013 webtoon Would You Like To Have Dinner Together? by Park Si-in. The story of series is about an unexpected dinner of two unknown person in the restaurant. Woo Do-hee (played by Seo Ji-hye) and Kim Hae-gyeong (played by Song Seung-heon). The two happen to have dinner together at a random place and decide to become dinner partners. The drama was aired by MBC TV on Mondays and Tuesdays from May 25 to July 14, 2020. It was also available on iQIYI with multi-languages subtitles globally.

Synopsis
Woo Do-hee (Seo Ji-hye), a producer at a digital content company, and Kim Hae-kyung (Song Seung-heon), a psychiatrist, meet by coincidence and end up eating dinner together. Later, they meet again by coincidence and decided to become "dinner mates" —  without knowledge of each other's personal details (name, occupation, etc.), they only meet up to eat dinner and talk.

Cast

Main
 Song Seung-heon as Kim Hae-kyung, a psychiatrist and food psychotherapist.
 Seo Ji-hye as Woo Do-hee, a producer-director at 2N BOX.
 Lee Ji-hoon as Jeong Jae-hyeok, a medical journalist freelancer, Do-hee's first love in college.
 Son Na-eun as Jin No-eul, a fitness instructor, Hae-kyung's first love.

People around Hae Kyung
 Lee Hyun-jin as Kang Gun-woo, stylist.
 Kim Seo-kyung as Lee Byeong-jin, Hae-kyung's secretary.
 Jeon Guk-hyang as Lee Moon-jung, Hae-kyung's mother.

2N BOX
 Ye Ji-won as Nam Ah-yeong, CEO of 2N BOX and friend of PD Woo Do-hee.
 Ko Kyu-pil as Park Jin-kyoo (planning team leader).
 Ahn Tae-hwan as Kim Jung-hwan (planning team member).
 Oh Hye-won as Im So-ra (ASMR Creator).
 Kim Young-chul as Jjoda Man.

Do-hee's family
 Jung Eun-pyo as Woo In-ho, Do-hee's father.
 Yoon Bok-in as Jun Sung-ja, Do-hee's mother.

Others
 Park Ho-san as Keanu / Kim Hyun-u

Special appearances
 Kim Jung-hyun as Lee Young-dong, Do-hee's ex-boyfriend (Ep. 1–2)
 Jung Sang-hoon as ER doctor (Ep. 2)
 Kim Hyun-sook as Keun-hee (Ep. 1–2, 8)
 Lee Si-eon as food truck operator (Ep. 3)
 Sandara Park as Hae-kyung's patient (Ep. 11)
 Tae Jin-ah as himself (Ep. 4)
 Kim Won-hae as depressed widower (Ep. 7)
 Kim Jae-won
 Seo Eun-soo as flight attendant (Ep. 1–2)
 Ryu Ji-kwang as himself (Ep. 14)
 Kim Hee-jung as eating show host (Ep. 14)
 ?? as Do-hee's blind date mate (Ep. 28)

Production

Development
The series is the third collaboration between director Ko Jae-hyun and actor Song Seung-heon after Black and Player.

Original soundtrack

Part 1

Special track

Part 2

Part 3

Part 4

Part 5

Viewership

Awards and nominations

Notes

References

External links
  
 Dinner Mate at Victory Contents 
 
 
 Dinner Mate on iQIYI

MBC TV television dramas
Korean-language television shows
2020 South Korean television series debuts
2020 South Korean television series endings
Television shows based on South Korean webtoons
South Korean romantic comedy television series
Television series by Victory Contents